Tomás Barros Pardo (Toledo, 1922 - La Coruña, 1986) was a Spanish painter and author.

Painter, poet, composer, author of plays, essays and one novel, occasional reporter, PhD in Fine Arts, and member of the Royal Galician Academy, Tomás Barros was one of the most prolific intellectuals among the Galician writers that stayed in Francoist Spain. As with many of this group of non-exiled artists and intellectuals, he shared concerns and collaborations with the exiled ones, as would be the case with Luis Seoane, Rafael Dieste, Vicente Aleixandre, Celso Emilio Ferreiro and his cousin Isaac Díaz Pardo

Biography
Accidentally born in Toledo in 1922, his family returned in 1929 to their city of origin, Ferrol, where he would spend his childhood and early youth. After graduating in Education in Santiago de Compostela, he moved to Madrid to graduate in fine arts at the Real Academia de Bellas Artes de San Fernando. For over 30 years he worked as a professor in technical drawing and plastic expression in A Coruña, where he combined it with artistic creation until his death.

His literary activity developed from the early 1950s, with his first published work, "Gárgolas", in 1950, and the foundation in 1952 of the poetry and literary magazine Aturuxo, along with Mario Couceiro and Miguel C. Vidal. In the 1950s, Barros published several poetic works and drama plays, as well as shorter essays and articles in newspapers and magazines. In 1975 he founded with Luz Pozo Garza the poetry magazine Nordés, and in 1973 was awarded with the International Poetry Award of the Circle Latin American Writers and Poets (CEPI) of New York. Until his death in 1986, his literary production included several theater plays and many newspaper and magazine collaborations.

His plastic production, increasingly abstract from the 1960s, is characterized by a concern with "rhythm, color and shape", as Barros himself developed in many of his artistic essays.

Selected published works

Poetry in Galician language
Berro diante da morte, 1963
Abraio, 1978
Vieiro de señardade, 1987

Poetry in Spanish language
Gárgola, 1950
La estrella y el cocodrilo, 1957
El helecho en el tejado, 1957
A imagen y semejanza, 1973
Los ojos de la colina, 1973

Theater plays
A casa abandoada, 1985
Fausto, Margarida e Aqueloutro, 1993
Panteón familiar, 1956
Tres pezas de teatro, 1981

Novel
El Rastro Invisible, 1990, Edicións do Castro (novela)

Essay
Los procesos abstractivos del arte contemporáneo, 1965
Sobre el origen de la corteza en los astros, 1973

Bibliography in English
IRIZARRY, Estelle, in "Writer-Painters of 20th Century Spain", 2010
McDERMID, Paul: Tomás Barros and his Faust: Love, Mystery and Synchronicity, en Galicia 21, 2011

References

External links
Profile at the University of A Coruña Virtual Library
Profile at the Universal Galician Encyclopaedia

1922 births
1986 deaths
Painters from Galicia (Spain)
Galician poets
Spanish male writers